Michaela Marzola (born 21 February 1966) is an Italian former alpine skier who competed in the 1988 Winter Olympics.

Biography
She is the sister of the other Italian skier Ivano Marzola.

World Cup results
Top 10

References

External links
 

1966 births
Living people
Italian female alpine skiers
Olympic alpine skiers of Italy
Alpine skiers at the 1988 Winter Olympics
Sportspeople from Südtirol
People from Sëlva